American Ride is the eighth studio album from American musician Willie Nile. It was released in June 2013 under Loud & Proud Records.

Critical reviews 
Hal Horowitz in American Songwriter says: "Nile delivers one of his finest and most passionate projects with American Ride."

Track listing

Personnel
Musicians
 Willie Nile – guitar, vocals, piano
 Johnny Pisano  – electric and upright bass, backing vocals
 Matt Hogan – guitars
 Alex Alexander – drums, percussion
 Steuart Smith – guitars, banjo, harmonium
 James Maddock – acoustic guitar, backing vocals
 Leslie Mendelson – backing vocals
 Rob Morsberger – string arrangement on "The Crossing", harmonium
 Oli Rockberger – piano, organ
 Suzanne Ornstein – violin, viola
 Lee Hogans – trumpet
 Matt Janiszewski – saxophone
 Johnny Pisano and Rob Morsberger – string arrangement on "Life On Bleecker Street"

Production and additional personnel
 Executive Producer: Andrew Fitzsimmons
 Produced by Stewart Lerman and Willie Nile
 Additional production: Johnny Pisano and Alex Alexander
 Engineered by James Frazee at Hobo Sound
 Mixing by Stewart Lerman at Hobo Sound, Weehawken, NJ
 Mastering by Greg Calbi at Sterling Sound, NYC
 Art direction by Deborah Maniaci
 Photography Christina Arrigoni
 Publicity – Cary Baker – Conqueroo, Los Angeles, CA

Charts

References

2013 albums
Willie Nile albums
Albums produced by Stewart Lerman